Wendefurth Power Station is a pumped-storage hydroelectric power station on the reservoir of the Wendefurth Dam near Wendefurth in the Harz mountains of central Germany.

The power station has an upper reservoir on the mountain top which stores the water. The two installed Francis pump turbines can deliver 80 MW.  the plant has since its commissioning in 1967 produced 4,105 GWh, corresponding to an average annual production of 91 GWh.

Gallery

References

External links 

 Das Pumpspeicherwerk Wendefurth at www.ruebeland.com. Description and map. 

Energy infrastructure completed in 1967
Dams in the Harz
Buildings and structures in Harz (district)
Hydroelectric power stations in Germany
Pumped-storage hydroelectric power stations in Germany